Sir William Osborne, 8th Baronet,  (d. 30 September 1783) was an Irish baronet and politician.

Biography
The son of Sir John Osborne, 7th Baronet and his wife Editha Proby, he succeeded in the baronetcy on 11 April 1743. 

Osborne served as High Sheriff of County Waterford in 1750 and served as a Member of Parliament in the Irish House of Commons for Carysfort between 1761 and 1768, for Dungarvan between 1768 and 1783 and for Carysfort again in 1783, and was sworn of the Irish Privy Council in 1770.

Marriage and issue
Sir William Osborne married (lic. 20 March 1749) Elizabeth Christmas, daughter of Thomas Christmas MP, of Whitfield, Co. Waterford and  Elizabeth  Marshall,  and had eight children: 
 Elizabeth Osborne (1754 - November 1783), married on 19 March 1774 as his first wife John Joshua Proby, 1st Earl of Carysfort (12 August 1751 – 7 April 1828)
 John Proby Osborne (1755 - December 1787), died unmarried without issue
 Revd. William Osborne, died unmarried without issue
 Ada Osborne, married her cousin Capt. Thomas Christmas and had issue
 unnamed daughter, died an infant
 Sir Thomas Osborne, 9th Baronet (1757 - 3 June 1821)
 Sir Henry Osborne, 11th Baronet (1759 - 27 October 1837)
 Rt. Hon. Charles Osborne (1760 - 5 September 1817) MP and judge of the Court of King's Bench (Ireland)

See also 
 Proby baronets

Sources
 G.E. Cokayne; with Vicary Gibbs, H.A. Doubleday, Geoffrey H. White, Duncan Warrand and Lord Howard de Walden, editors, The Complete Peerage of England, Scotland, Ireland, Great Britain and the United Kingdom, Extant, Extinct or Dormant, new ed., 13 volumes in 14 (1910-1959; reprint in 6 volumes, Gloucester, U.K.: Alan Sutton Publishing, 2000), volume III, page 71.
 Charles Mosley, editor, Burke's Peerage, Baronetage & Knightage, 107th edition, 3 volumes (Wilmington, Delaware, U.S.A.: Burke's Peerage (Genealogical Books) Ltd, 2003), volume 2, page 3031.

External links
 www.thepeerage.com

Year of birth unknown
1783 deaths
Osborne baronets
Irish MPs 1761–1768
Irish MPs 1769–1776
Irish MPs 1776–1783
Irish MPs 1783–1790
Members of the Privy Council of Ireland
High Sheriffs of County Waterford
Members of the Parliament of Ireland (pre-1801) for County Wicklow constituencies
Members of the Parliament of Ireland (pre-1801) for County Waterford constituencies